Altherr is a surname. Notable people with the surname include:

Aaron Altherr (born 1991), German-American professional baseball outfielder
Hans Altherr (born 1950), Swiss politician
Heinrich Altherr (1878–1947), Swiss painter
Walter Altherr (born 1946), German politician